All You Can Eat is the second record by the Japanese band, Beat Crusaders. It was also their second album to be released in the United States.

Track listing 
 "GTS" – 2:07
 "Joker in the Crotch" – 1:47
 "Windom" – 2:33
 "Firestarter" – 2:58
 "Sad Symphony" – 2:10
 "Delerious" – 2:06
 "Blister Blues" – 2:23
 "Ponderosa" (At The Speed Of Sound) – 0:58

Sources
http://www.cdjapan.co.jp/detailview.html?KEY=DAKLACD-27 

2000 albums
Beat Crusaders albums